Ethmostigmus muiri is a species of centipede in the Scolopendridae family. It is endemic to Australia and was first described in 1983 by L. E. Koch.

Distribution
The species has been recorded from northern and eastern Queensland and from north-west Western Australia.

Behaviour
The centipedes are solitary terrestrial predators that inhabit plant litter, soil and rotting wood.

References

 

 
muiri
Centipedes of Australia
Endemic fauna of Australia
Fauna of Queensland
Fauna of Western Australia
Animals described in 1983